Angelica californica is a species of angelica known as California angelica. It is found in northern California and occasionally in southern Oregon. Its habitats are the dry, low-elevation slopes of the foothills and coast ranges. It bears umbels of white angelica flowers.

References
Jepson Manual Treatment
USDA Plants Profile

californica
Flora of California
Flora without expected TNC conservation status